Oleh Hrytsai (born 24 July 1973, Soviet Union) is a retired professional Ukrainian football forward.

Career
Along with Hennadiy Skidan, Hrytsai became the highest scorer when he scored 22 goals for FC Cherkasy during the 1997–98 Ukrainian First League season. The next season Hrytsai became the highest scorer when he scored 19 goals for FC Cherkasy during the 1998–99 Ukrainian First League season.

Honours
Dnipro Cherkasy
 Ukrainian Football Amateur Association: 2003

FC Cheksyl Chernihiv
 Chernihiv Oblast Football Championship 1992

Individual
 Top Scorer Ukrainian First League: 1997–98 (22 goals)
 Top Scorer Ukrainian First League: 1998–99 (19 goals)

References

External links

1974 births
Living people
Footballers from Chernihiv
Ukrainian footballers
Ukrainian Premier League players
FC Dnipro Cherkasy players
FC Krystal Chortkiv players
FC Spartak Ivano-Frankivsk players
FC Dnipro players
FC Dnipro-2 Dnipropetrovsk players
FC Dnipro-3 Dnipropetrovsk players
FC Nafkom Brovary players
FC Polissya Zhytomyr players
FC Desna Chernihiv players
FC Khodak Cherkasy players
FC Cheksyl Chernihiv players
Association football forwards